Hamm AG is a German worldwide manufacturer and marketer of road rollers based in Tirschenreuth, Germany. It is a subsidiary of Wirtgen Group.

Brothers Anton and Franz Hamm, who were gunsmiths, founded the company in 1878 to build agricultural equipment. The company built their first diesel-powered road roller in 1911, from a design by a second-generation Hamm, Hans Hamm. This was at a time when most rollers where steam powered. In 1928 the company abandoned all other product lines to concentrate on road rollers. Hamm produces the first all-wheel drive-all-wheel steering double-drum . The company introduced an all-wheel steering and all-wheel drive rubber-wheeled roller in 1963, and then rolled out its oscillating vibratory roller in 1989.

In 1999 the Wirtgen Group GmbH announced that it would purchase Hamm AG, and the transaction was completed in March 2000.

References

External links

 Hamm AG (ENGLISH)
 Hamm AG (GERMAN)
 Hamm America
 Hamm India (ENGLISH)

Construction equipment manufacturers of Germany
Companies established in 1878
Companies based in Bavaria
German brands